Haneuljae, also known as Gyerimnyeong (계립령/鷄立嶺) is a mountain pass in the Sobaek Mountains of central South Korea. It runs between Chungju city in North Chungcheong province and Mungyeong city in North Gyeongsang province.

During the Silla and Goryeo periods of Korean history, it played a role of critical importance, as the principal pathway between southeastern and southwestern Korea, and in particular between the valleys of the Han and Nakdong rivers.  In the Joseon period, this role was taken over by the pass of Mungyeong Saejae, and Haneuljae fell into disuse.  Today only a minor country road traverses the pass.

Seo (2001) contends that the pass played a particularly critical role in the diffusion of Buddhism into Silla from Goguryeo.  The first monks bearing Buddhism to Silla came by land from the north, and Haneuljae would have been their most likely route.  In addition, the area around Sangju; which would have been the first major city a traveler from the north would come to after crossing Haneuljae, became an early center of Buddhism, in contrast to the rest of Silla, which put up stiff resistance to the new faith.

The Chungju side of Haneuljae is currently protected as part of Woraksan National Park.

References

Seo, Y.-i. (2001).  신라 육상 교통로 계립령 (Silla yuksang gyotongno gyerimnyeong / Gyerimnyeong, land transportation route of Silla.)  In Mungyeong Saejae Museum (Ed.), 길 위의 역사, 고개의 문화 (Gil wi-ui yeoksa, gogae-ui munhwa / The history upon the road, the culture of the passes), pp. 129–150.  Seoul:  Silcheon Munhak.

See also
List of mountain passes
Baekdudaegan

Landforms of North Gyeongsang Province
Landforms of North Chungcheong Province
Mountain passes of South Korea
Silla
Goryeo
Mungyeong
Chungju